Märt Israel (born 23 September 1983 in Karksi-Nuia) is a male discus thrower from Estonia. His personal best is 66.98, achieved in May 2011 in Chula Vista (his previous best was 66.56 metres, achieved in September 2007 in Helsingborg).

Achievements

References

1983 births
Living people
People from Karksi-Nuia
Estonian male discus throwers
Olympic athletes of Estonia
Athletes (track and field) at the 2008 Summer Olympics
Athletes (track and field) at the 2012 Summer Olympics
Universiade medalists in athletics (track and field)
World Athletics Championships athletes for Estonia
Universiade bronze medalists for Estonia
Medalists at the 2007 Summer Universiade
Medalists at the 2011 Summer Universiade
Universiade gold medalists for Estonia